Oolitic may refer to:

 Oolite, a sedimentary rock consisting of ooids
 Oolitic, Indiana, a town whose name came from the underlying limestone
 Oolitic aragonite sand, which is formed naturally, and used extensively in reef aquariums